Luca Agamennoni (born 8 August 1980) is a former Italian rower who won silver medal and bronze medal in the  2008 Summer Olympics in Beijing and 2004 Summer Olympics in Athens.

Biography
Luca Agamennoni has participated in four editions of the Summer Olympics (from Athens 2004 to Rio de Janeiro 2016), nine of the Rowing World Championships at senior level (from 2001 to 2015) and four of the European Rowing Championships (from 2007 to 2014) at senior level .

Achievements

References

External links
 

1980 births
Living people
Italian male rowers
Olympic rowers of Italy
Rowers at the 2004 Summer Olympics
Rowers at the 2008 Summer Olympics
Rowers at the 2012 Summer Olympics
Rowers at the 2016 Summer Olympics
Olympic bronze medalists for Italy
Olympic silver medalists for Italy
Sportspeople from Livorno
Olympic medalists in rowing
Medalists at the 2008 Summer Olympics
World Rowing Championships medalists for Italy
Medalists at the 2004 Summer Olympics
Mediterranean Games gold medalists for Italy
Competitors at the 2005 Mediterranean Games
Mediterranean Games medalists in rowing
Rowers of Fiamme Gialle